Tambo County may refer to:
 County of Tambo, Queensland
 County of Tambo, Victoria